"Con Tu Amor" (English: "With Your Love") is a song written by Daniel Garcia and Mario Schajris and performed by Mexican singer Cristian Castro. It was released as the second single from his album El Camino del Alma. It became his second number one song on the Billboard Latin Pop Airplay chart in 1995.  It was recognized as one of best-performing songs of the year at the 1996 ASCAP Latin Awards. A live version of the song was included on Castro's album En Primera Fila: Día 2 (2014). The song was covered by Cuban salsa singer Guianko on his album Mi Forma de Sentir (1998). A music video was filmed for this single.

Charts

Weekly charts

Year-end charts

See also
List of Billboard Latin Pop Airplay number ones of 1995

References

1994 songs
1994 singles
Cristian Castro songs
Spanish-language songs
Fonovisa Records singles